Tseng Hua-te (Paiwan: Tjivuluan; born 18 October 1957) is a Taiwanese Paiwan politician. A member of the Kuomintang, he represented the Highland Aborigine Constituency in the Legislative Yuan from 1999 to 2008.

Education and early career
Tseng studied at Taitung Agricultural Extension School and what became the National Pingtung University of Education. He later took graduate-level coursework in public administration at Tunghai University. Prior to his political career, Tseng was a teacher.

Political career
Tseng served two terms as mayor of Laiyi, Pingtung, followed by two terms as a member of the Taiwan Provincial Assembly. He was elected to three terms as a member of the Legislative Yuan, serving the Highland Aborigine Constituency, and representing the Kuomintang.

In 2002, Tseng and other lawmakers voted in opposition to Kuomintang caucus directives while considering nominations for the Examination Yuan. He was proposed for expulsion from the party, though the only punitive measure he received was an admonition.

Personal life
Tseng is of Paiwan descent and has led the Autonomous Confederation of Paiwan Aborigines.

References

1957 births
Living people
Mayors of places in Taiwan
Politicians of the Republic of China on Taiwan from Pingtung County
Members of the 4th Legislative Yuan
Members of the 5th Legislative Yuan
Members of the 6th Legislative Yuan
Aboriginal Members of the Legislative Yuan
Kuomintang Members of the Legislative Yuan in Taiwan
Tunghai University alumni
National Pingtung University of Education alumni
Taiwanese schoolteachers
Paiwan people
20th-century Taiwanese educators